Seyed Ali Aghazadeh Dafsari (born on 1959) is an Iranian politician and representative of Rasht at Parliament of Iran. He was elected as a member of parliament in the parliamentary election of 2008, but was defeated in 2012 and 2016. He was later elected again in 2020.
 
On July 20, 2011, Dafsari claimed that Revolutionary Guard forces shot down an unmanned United States spy plane over the Fordo uranium enrichment facility.

References

People from Rasht
1955 births
Living people
Members of the 8th Islamic Consultative Assembly
Members of the 11th Islamic Consultative Assembly
Deputies of Rasht
Islamic Revolutionary Guard Corps second brigadier generals